Melanophrys is a genus of bristle flies in the family Tachinidae. There are at least two described species in Melanophrys.

Species
These two species belong to the genus Melanophrys:
 Melanophrys flavipennis Williston, 1886
 Melanophrys insolita (Walker, 1853)

References

Further reading

External links

 
 

Tachininae